was a Japanese film actress. She appeared in more than 150 films between 1940 and 1994. She starred in the film The Temptress and the Monk, which was entered into the 8th Berlin International Film Festival. Her husband was the director Umetsugu Inoue.

Selected filmography
 Late Spring (1949)
 The Bells of Nagasaki (1950)
 Hiroshima (1953)
 Ojōsan shachō (1953)
 Twenty-Four Eyes (1954)
 A Hole of My Own Making (1955)
 The Eternal Breasts (1955)
 The Temptress and the Monk (1958)
 Love Under the Crucifix (1962)
 Karei-naru Ichizoku (1974)

References

External links

1922 births
2017 deaths
Japanese film actresses
20th-century Japanese actresses
Actors from Hiroshima